Kansas's 10th Senate district is one of 40 districts in the Kansas Senate. It has been represented by Republican Mike Thompson since his appointment in 2020 to replace fellow Republican Mary Pilcher-Cook.

Geography
District 10 is based in Shawnee in Johnson County, covering the vast majority of the city itself as well as Lake Quivira and parts of Overland Park, Bonner Springs, and Merriam.

The district is located entirely within Kansas's 3rd congressional district, and overlaps with the 17th, 18th, 23rd, 24th, and 39th districts of the Kansas House of Representatives.

Recent election results

2020
In January 2020, 10th district incumbent Mary Pilcher-Cook resigned from the Senate, and local meteorologist Mike Thompson was chosen to fill the remainder of her term.

2016

2012

Federal and statewide results in District 10

References

10
Johnson County, Kansas